Bailey Williams may refer to:

 Bailey Williams (footballer, born 1997), Australian rules footballer who plays for the Western Bulldogs in the Australian Football League
 Bailey Williams (footballer, born 2000), Australian rules footballer who plays for the West Coast Eagles in the Australian Football League